Allium libani (Lebanese garlic	 ثوم لبناني )  is a species of wild bulbous plant geophyte  of the genus Allium, belonging to the family of Amaryllidaceae. Allium libani is endemic to the Middle East in Lebanon and Syria.

Taxonomy
Allium libani was described by Pierre Edmond Boissier and published in Diagnoses plantarum orientalium novarum 13: 26, in 1854.

Etymology
Allium  old generic name. The plants of this genus were known by both the Romans as the Greeks . However, it seems that the term has an origin in Celtic which means "to burn", referring to the strong pungent smell of the plant. One of the first to use this name for botanical purposes was the French naturalist Joseph Pitton de Tournefort (1656 - 1708).
libani  epithet, refers to its geographic location in Lebanon.

Description
Allium libani is deciduous. The simple leaves are basal. They are broadly linear with entire margins and parallel venation. The scape characteristic of the family is essentially absent, so the umbel appears to be formed at ground level The flowers of Allium libani are white. Fruits are loculicidal capsules.

Cultivation
The plants prefer a sunny situation on dry to moderately moist soil. The substrate should be sandy-loamy, gritty-loamy or sandy clay soil. They tolerate temperatures down to -7 °C

References

libani
Flora of Lebanon and Syria
Onions
Plants described in 1854
Taxa named by Pierre Edmond Boissier